Zashkiv may refer to these villages and Zashkiv festival in the Ukraine. 

 Zashkiv, Zhovkva Raion
 Zashkiv, Zolochiv Raion, Lviv Oblast.
 Zashkiv, Festival